The Neomorphinae are a subfamily of the cuckoo family, Cuculidae.  Members of this subfamily are known as New World ground cuckoos, since most are largely terrestrial and native to the Americas. Only Dromococcyx and Tapera are more arboreal, and these are also the only brood parasitic cuckoos in the Americas, while the remaining all build their own nests.

Genera

References